Saint-Nizier-du-Moucherotte is a commune in the Isère department in the Auvergne-Rhône-Alpes region in Southeastern France. In 2019, it had a population of 1,083.

Demographics

1968 Winter Olympics
The commune hosted the ski jumping individual large hill event for the 1968 Winter Olympics held in neighbouring Grenoble, on the Dauphine site on Le Moucherotte. Its hill had a calculation or K-point of 90 metres and was constructed between July 1966 and January 1967. During training, the longest jump reached was 112 metres. Final construction continued throughout the summer of 1967. During the 1968 Games, it seated 50,000 spectators.

See also
Communes of the Isère department
Parc naturel régional du Vercors

References

Venues of the 1968 Winter Olympics
Communes of Isère
Olympic ski jumping venues
Isère communes articles needing translation from French Wikipedia